Aodh mac Aidmhire, Irish dynast, fl. c. 600.

Aodh was the father of seven notable saints: Bairrfhionn; Fionnbharr; Maoldubh; Crónán; Gar Bhán; Sabh; Aille. Aodh was from Aughrim, County Galway, and is given as a descendant of Brión mac Echach Muigmedóin. In the genealogies he is given as Aodh, from Eachdhruim mac nAodha.

References

 The Great Book of Irish Genealogies, 710.7, pp. 718–19, volume two, Dubhaltach MacFhirbhisigh; edited, with translation and indices by Nollaig Ó Muraíle, 2003–2004. .

People from County Galway
6th-century Irish people